The following outline is provided as an overview of and topical guide to East Timor:

East Timor – sovereign island nation located in Southeast Asia.  East Timor comprises the eastern half of the Island of Timor, the nearby islands of Atauro and Jaco, and Oecussi-Ambeno, an exclave  on the northwestern side of the island, within Indonesian West Timor. The small country of 15,410 km² (5,400 sq mi) is located about 640 km (400 mi) northwest of Darwin, Australia.

East Timor was colonized by Portugal in the 16th century, and was known as Portuguese Timor until Portugal's decolonization of the country. In late 1975 East Timor declared its independence but was invaded and occupied by Indonesia later that year, and declared that country's 27th province the following year. In 1999, following the United Nations-sponsored act of self-determination, Indonesia relinquished control of the territory and East Timor became the first new sovereign state of the twenty-first century on May 20, 2002. East Timor is one of only two predominantly Roman Catholic countries in Southeast Asia, the other being the Philippines.

At US$2,500, the per capita GDP (purchasing power parity adjusted) of East Timor is one of the lowest in the world. Its Human Development Index (HDI), however, corresponds to a medium degree of human development and places East Timor 142nd among the world's states.

General reference

 Pronunciation: 
 Common English country names: East Timor or Timor-Leste
 Official English country name: The Democratic Republic of Timor-Leste
 Common endonym(s):
 
 
 Official endonym(s):  
 Adjectival(s): Timorese
 Demonym(s):
 Etymology: Name of East Timor
 ISO country codes: TL, TLS, 626
 ISO region codes: See ISO 3166-2:TL
 Internet country code top-level domain: .tl

Geography of East Timor

Geography of East Timor
 East Timor is: a country
 Location:
 Southern Hemisphere and Eastern Hemisphere
 Eurasia (though not on the mainland)
 Asia
 Southeast Asia
 Maritime Southeast Asia
 Island of Timor (the eastern half)
 Time zone:  UTC+09
 Extreme points of East Timor
 High:  Mount Ramelau 
 Low:  Timor Sea 0 m
 Land boundaries:   228 km
 Coastline:  706 km
 Population of East Timor: 1,155,000  - 152nd most populous country

 Area of East Timor: 14,874 km2
 Atlas of East Timor

Environment of East Timor

 Climate of East Timor
 Protected areas of East Timor
 National parks of East Timor
 Wildlife of East Timor
 Fauna of East Timor
 Birds of East Timor
 Mammals of East Timor

Natural geographic features of East Timor
 Islands of East Timor
 Rivers of East Timor
 World Heritage Sites in East Timor: None

Regions of East Timor

Ecoregions of East Timor

Administrative divisions of East Timor

Administrative divisions of East Timor
 Districts of East Timor
 Subdistricts of East Timor
 Sucos of East Timor

Districts of East Timor

Districts of East Timor

Subdistricts of East Timor

Subdistricts of East Timor

Sucos of East Timor

Sucos of East Timor
 Capital of East Timor: Dili
 Cities of East Timor

Demography of East Timor

Demographics of East Timor

Government and politics of East Timor

 Form of government: unitary semi-presidential representative democratic republic
 Capital of East Timor: Dili
 Elections in East Timor
 Political parties in East Timor

Branches of the government of East Timor

 Government of East Timor

Executive branch of the government of East Timor
 Head of state: President of East Timor, Francisco Guterres
 Head of government: Prime Minister of East Timor, Rui Maria de Araújo

Legislative branch of the government of East Timor
 Parliament of East Timor: National Assembly (unicameral)

Judicial branch of the government of East Timor

 Court system of East Timor

Foreign relations of East Timor

 Foreign relations of East Timor
 Diplomatic missions in East Timor
 Diplomatic missions of East Timor

International organization membership
The Democratic Republic of Timor-Leste is a member of:

 African, Caribbean, and Pacific Group of States (ACP)
 Asian Development Bank (ADB)
 Association of Southeast Asian Nations (ASEAN)
 Association of Southeast Asian Nations Regional Forum (ARF)
 Comunidade dos Países de Língua Portuguesa (CPLP)
 Food and Agriculture Organization (FAO)
 Group of 77 (G77)
 International Bank for Reconstruction and Development (IBRD)
 International Civil Aviation Organization (ICAO)
 International Criminal Court (ICCt)
 International Criminal Police Organization (Interpol)
 International Development Association (IDA)
 International Federation of Red Cross and Red Crescent Societies (IFRCS)
 International Finance Corporation (IFC)
 International Fund for Agricultural Development (IFAD)
 International Labour Organization (ILO)
 International Maritime Organization (IMO)
 International Monetary Fund (IMF)

 International Olympic Committee (IOC)
 Inter-Parliamentary Union (IPU)
 Multilateral Investment Guarantee Agency (MIGA)
 Nonaligned Movement (NAM)
 Organisation for the Prohibition of Chemical Weapons (OPCW)
 Pacific Islands Forum (PIF) (observer)
 União Latina
 United Nations (UN)
 United Nations Conference on Trade and Development (UNCTAD)
 United Nations Educational, Scientific, and Cultural Organization (UNESCO)
 United Nations Industrial Development Organization (UNIDO)
 Universal Postal Union (UPU)
 World Customs Organization (WCO)
 World Federation of Trade Unions (WFTU)
 World Health Organization (WHO)
 World Tourism Organization (UNWTO)
 International Telecommunication Union (ITU)

Law and order in East Timor

 Law of East Timor
 Cannabis in East Timor
 Constitution of East Timor
 Human rights in East Timor
 LGBT rights in East Timor
 Freedom of religion in East Timor
 Law enforcement in East Timor

Military of East Timor

 Timor Leste Defence Force
 Command
 Commander-in-chief:
 Forces
 Timor Leste Defence Force
 Military ranks of East Timor

Local government in East Timor

History of East Timor

History of East Timor

Culture of East Timor
Culture of East Timor
 Cuisine of East Timor
 Languages of East Timor
 National symbols of East Timor
 Coat of arms of East Timor
 Flag of East Timor
 National anthem of East Timor
 People of East Timor
 Prostitution in East Timor
 Public holidays in East Timor
 Religion in East Timor
 Christianity in East Timor
 Hinduism in East Timor
 Islam in East Timor
 World Heritage Sites in East Timor: None

Art in East Timor
 Music of East Timor

Sports in East Timor

Sports in East Timor
 Football in East Timor
 East Timor at the Olympics

Economy and infrastructure of East Timor

Economy of East Timor
 Economic rank, by nominal GDP (2007): 177th (one hundred and seventy seventh)
 Communications in East Timor
 Internet in East Timor
 Currency of East Timor: Centavo/Dollar
 ISO 4217: USD
 Transport in East Timor
 Airports in East Timor
 Rail transport in East Timor

Education in East Timor

Education in East Timor

See also

East Timor

List of East Timor-related topics
List of international rankings
Member state of the United Nations
Outline of Asia
Outline of geography

References

External links

Government
Timor-Leste.gov Official government site

Other

 
Outline
East Timor
East Timor